The Henry Laurence Gantt Medal was established in 1929 by the American Management Association and the Management section of the American Society of Mechanical Engineers for "distinguished achievement in management and service to the community" in honour of Henry Laurence Gantt. By the year 1984 in total 45 medals had been awarded.

Award winners 

20th-century winners, a selection
 1929: Henry Laurence Gantt (posthumously)
 1930: Fred J. Miller,
 1931: Leon Pratt Alford
 1932: Henry S. Dennison
 1933: Henry Wallace Clark
 1934: Horace B. Cheney
 1935: Arthur Howland Young
 1936: Morris Evans Leeds (1869–1952)
 1940: William Loren Batt
 1941: Paul Eugene Holden
 1943: Dexter S. Kimball
 1944: Frank Bunker Gilbreth Sr. (posthumously) and Lillian Moller Gilbreth
 1945: John Milton Hancock
 1946: Paul G. Hoffman
 1947: Alvin E. Dodd
 1948: Harold Fowler McCormick
 1949: Arthur Clinton Spurr
 1950: Charles R. Hook Sr.
 1951: Thomas Roy Jones
 1952: Frank Henry Neely (1884–1979)
 1953: Thomas E. Millsop
 1954: Clarence Francis
 1955: Walker Lee Cisler
 1956: Henning Webb Prentis Jr.
 1957: Harold F. Smiddy 
 1958: Richard Redwood Deupree
 1959: Peter Drucker
 1960: Charles McCormick
 1961: Lyndall Urwick
 1962: Austin J. Tobin
 1963: Lawrence A. Appley
 1964: Harold Bright Maynard
 1965: Ralph J. Cordiner
 1968: J. Erik Jonsson
 1969: Dave Packard
 1970: Frederick R. Kappel
 1971: Donald C. Burnham 
 1972: Robert Elton Brooker
 1973: John T. Connor 
 1974: Willard Rockwell
 1975: Patrick E. Haggerty
 1976: Kenneth Daniel
 1982: Charles Luckman
 1983: Walter A. Fallon
 1984: Rawleigh Warner Jr.
 1987: Edmund T. Pratt Jr.
 1988: William S. Lee
 1996: George N. Hatsopoulos

 21st-century winners
 2000: Paul Soros
 2001: Roy Huffington
 2002: Alexander W. Dreyfoos Jr.
 2003: William R. Timken
 2004: Julie Spicer England
 2006: Charla K. Wise
 2007: Dean L. Kamen
 2009: Charles M. Vest
 2018: Todd R. Allen
 2019: Margaret G. McCullough

References

External links 
ASME Official Medal Page

 
Awards established in 1929
1929 establishments in the United States
Management awards
ASME Medals